Sam Shing may refer to:
 Sam Shing Hui, a former fishing village in Tuen Mun, Hong Kong
 Sam Shing Estate, a public housing estate in Tuen Mun, Hong Kong
 Sam Shing stop, an MTR Light Rail stop adjacent to the estate